Paul Christian Manning,  (born 6 November 1974, Sutton Coldfield) is a former English professional track and road bicycle racer who rode for the UCI Professional Continental team Landbouwkrediet-Tönissteiner in 2007 and 2008. He is strong in the Individual and Team Pursuit disciplines on track and has won many medals for Britain in the Olympics, Commonwealth Games, Track World Championships and Track World Cups.

He was the British national individual pursuit champion in 2001, 2003, 2004 and 2005. He was also the national points race champion in 2005.

On 17 August 2008, Manning was a member of the Olympic team pursuit squad which broke the world record in the heats with a time of 3:55:202, beating their Russian opponents comfortably to go through to the final ride-off for silver and gold. The following day, on their way to winning the gold medal, the British Team pursuit broke their own world record in a time of 3:53:314, beating their Danish competitors by 6.7 seconds.

After the Olympics he announced his retirement from professional cycling. Manning was appointed Member of the Order of the British Empire (MBE) in the 2009 New Year Honours.

In 2009, he was inducted into the British Cycling Hall of Fame.

After his retirement Manning joined the GB Cycling Team coaching staff as women's endurance coach; since then the women's endurance team has broken the Team Pursuit world record six times, once in winning the gold medal at the 2012 London Olympics. Manning won the ‘High Performance Coach of the Year Award’ at the 2012 UK Coaching Awards.

He studied Earth Sciences at the University of Birmingham and graduated in 1996.

Palmares

Olympics
2000 Sydney
 3rd, Team Pursuit (bronze medal)
2004 Athens
 2nd, Team Pursuit (silver medal)
2008 Beijing
 1st, Team Pursuit (gold medal)

World Championships
2000 Manchester
 2nd, Team Pursuit
2001 Belgium
 2nd, Team Pursuit
2003 Stuttgart
 2nd, Team Pursuit
 4th, Individual Pursuit
2004 Melbourne
 2nd, Team Pursuit
2005 Los Angeles
 1st, Team Pursuit
2006 Bordeaux
 2nd, Team Pursuit
 3rd, Individual Pursuit
2007 Palma de Mallorca
 1st, Team Pursuit
2008 Manchester
 1st, Team Pursuit

Commonwealth Games
2002 Manchester
 2nd, Team Pursuit
 3rd, Individual Pursuit
2006 Melbourne
 1st, Individual Pursuit
 1st, Team Pursuit
 9th, Men's Road Time Trial

UCI Track World Cup
2002 Mexico
 1st, Individual Pursuit
2003 South Africa
 2nd, Team Pursuit
2003 Mexico
 2nd, Team Pursuit
 3rd, Individual Pursuit
2004 Sydney
 1st, Individual Pursuit
 1st, Team Pursuit
2004 Manchester
 3rd, Individual Pursuit
 1st, Team Pursuit
2005/6 Manchester
 1st, Team Pursuit
 1st, Individual Pursuit
2006 Moscow
 1st, Team Pursuit
 3rd, Individual Pursuit

British Championships
2001
 1st, Individual Pursuit
2003
 1st, Individual Pursuit
2004
 1st, Individual Pursuit
 1st, Team Pursuit
2005
 1st, Points Race
 1st, Individual Pursuit

Other results
1996
 Duo Normand (with Chris Boardman)
2001
 FBD Milk Ras
2002
 FBD Milk Ras stage 6
2003
 Herald Sun Tour stage 8
2007
 Tour of Britain stage 6

References

External links
 Paul Manning Bio on Britishcycling.com
 Paul Manning interviewed by students

1974 births
Living people
English male cyclists
UCI Track Cycling World Champions (men)
English Olympic medallists
Olympic gold medallists for Great Britain
Olympic silver medallists for Great Britain
Olympic bronze medallists for Great Britain
Olympic cyclists of Great Britain
Cyclists at the 2000 Summer Olympics
Cyclists at the 2004 Summer Olympics
Cyclists at the 2008 Summer Olympics
Cyclists at the 2002 Commonwealth Games
Cyclists at the 2006 Commonwealth Games
Sportspeople from Sutton Coldfield
Commonwealth Games gold medallists for England
Commonwealth Games silver medallists for England
Commonwealth Games bronze medallists for England
Members of the Order of the British Empire
People from Burntwood
Olympic medalists in cycling
English cycling coaches
Medalists at the 2008 Summer Olympics
Alumni of the University of Birmingham
Medalists at the 2004 Summer Olympics
Medalists at the 2000 Summer Olympics
Commonwealth Games medallists in cycling
English track cyclists
Rás Tailteann winners
Medallists at the 2002 Commonwealth Games
Medallists at the 2006 Commonwealth Games